Horace Mitchell Miner (May 26, 1912 – November 26, 1993) was an American anthropologist, particularly interested in those languages of his time that were still closely tied to the earth and agricultural practices.

During World War II, he served as a counterintelligence agent in Italy and Japan. In 1937, he earned his doctorate at the University of Chicago, going on to teach there, as well as at other universities in the United States, and on a Fulbright Fellowship at a college in Uganda. He later worked elsewhere in Africa, and in South America.

He published several books, including Culture and Agriculture (1949) and City in Modern Africa (1967). However, he is equally famous for a satirical essay entitled "Body Ritual among the Nacirema", which not only satirizes American culture from an anthropological perspective and, as the Encyclopedia of Social and Cultural Anthropology states, "...offered incipient cultural critiques of Euro-American arrogance, by showing that magic is not the prerogative of non-Western societies," but also provides "a classic and apt example of how ethnocentrism can color one's thinking."

The work was also featured in American Anthropologist.

Awards and Honors

 Decorated Legion of Merit, Bronze Star
 Fulbright research award
 Society Science Research Council Fellow, 1936–37
 Recipient Social Science Research Council Demobilization award, 1945
 Horace Rackham grant for field research Algeria, 1950
 Ford Foundation grantee, 1956; Rockefeller Foundation grantee, Nigeria, 1957–58
 Election to the American Philosophical Society, 1966
 National Science Foundation grant for research Nigeria, 1970-71

Education
AB- University Kentucky, (1933)

A.M.- University Chicago, (1935)

PhD- University Chicago, (1937)

Postgrad- (Yale Institute Human Relations fellow), Colombia, (1942)

References 

 Body Ritual among the Nacirema, American Anthropologist, June 1956

1912 births
1993 deaths
Recipients of the Legion of Merit
20th-century American anthropologists
American military personnel of World War II
University of Chicago alumni
Members of the American Philosophical Society